Newstead is a village and civil parish in Nottinghamshire, England in the borough of Gedling. It is situated between the city of Nottingham and the towns of Kirkby-in-Ashfield, Sutton-in-Ashfield and Hucknall.

A former coal mining village, and previously called Newstead Colliery Village. Lord Byron, the poet, lived at nearby Newstead Abbey. The parish is part of Nottinghamshire's Hidden Valleys. It has a population of 1,194, increasing to 1,312 at the 2011 census.

Newstead Primary School is a state run primary school for children aged 5 to 11.

Newstead railway station is on the Robin Hood Line, which runs from Nottingham to Worksop.

Newstead Colliery Village

The colliery village was built at Newstead in the late-19th century for miners at Newstead and Annesley Collieries. Newstead Colliery operated between 1874 and 1987.

The former mining location has now been redeveloped into a nature reserve and business park. Hazelford Way Industrial Estate is home to several large companies including Bunches Florapost; Badgemaster; and Leivers and Millership.

Gallery

Notable people
Richard Allsebrook, footballer
Michael Shelton, Paralympic gold medal-winning snooker player

References

External links

Headstock Music Festival
Newstead Abbey Historic House and Gardens

Villages in Nottinghamshire
Civil parishes in Nottinghamshire
Gedling